Euphorbia hofstaetteri is a species of plant in the family Euphorbiaceae. It is endemic to Madagascar.  Its natural habitats are subtropical or tropical dry shrubland and rocky areas. It is threatened by habitat loss.

References

Endemic flora of Madagascar
hofstaetteri
Vulnerable plants
Taxonomy articles created by Polbot